Udayarpalayam (Tamil: உடையார்பாளையம்), is a panchayat town near Jayankondam in Ariyalur district.

Udayarpalayam may also refer to:
 Udayarpalayam taluk, a taluk of Ariyalur district.
 Udayarpalayam division, a revenue division of Ariyalur district.